Jarmo Kujanpää (born 5 April 1959 in Ikaalinen) is a retired Finnish footballer who played as a centre forward.

External links
 
 Footballzz.co.uk profile

1959 births
Living people
Finnish footballers
Association football forwards
FC Haka players
Finland youth international footballers
People from Ikaalinen
Sportspeople from Pirkanmaa